Grevillea haplantha is a species of flowering plant in the family Proteaceae and is endemic to the south-west of Western Australia. It is a dense, rounded shrub with linear leaves and clusters of pink to red flowers with white or brown hairs, depending on subspecies.

Description
Flowering time and colour vary with subspecies.

Taxonomy
Grevillea haplantha was first formally described in 1870 by George Bentham in Flora Australiensis from specimens collected by George Maxwell on East Mount Barren. The specific epithet (haplantha) means "single-flowered".

In 1993 Peter M. Olde and Neil R. Marriott described two subspecies in the journal Nuytsia, and the names are accepted by the Australian Plant Census:

Distribution and habitat
Subspecies haplantha grows in mallee heath or shrubland mainly in the Coolgardie area, and subsp. recedens grows in open shrubland or woodland between Mollerin, Ballidu, Cunderdin and Merredin.

Conservation status
Subspecies haplantha is listed as "not threatened" by the Government of Western Australia Department of Biodiversity, Conservation and Attractions but subsp. recedens is listed as "Priority Three", meaning that it is poorly known and known from only a few locations but is not under imminent threat.

See also
 List of Grevillea species

References

haplantha
Endemic flora of Western Australia
Eudicots of Western Australia
Proteales of Australia
Taxa named by George Bentham
Plants described in 1870